Disparctia varicolor is a moth of the family Erebidae. It was described by Hervé de Toulgoët in 1978. It is found in Rwanda and Uganda.

References

Erebid moths of Africa
Moths described in 1978